KMTS (99.1 FM) is a radio station broadcasting a Country format. Licensed to Glenwood Springs, Colorado, United States, the station is currently owned by Colorado West Broadcasting and features programming from ABC News Radio and Westwood One.

References

External links
FCC History Cards for KMTS
 
 

MTS
Radio stations established in 1988